The Isfahan Seminary is one of the oldest seminaries in Isfahan, Iran. Currently, more than 40 schools in Isfahan province are under the supervision of the Management Center of Isfahan Seminary and the leadership of the supreme authority of Grand Ayatollah Hossein Mazaheri.

History
Isfahan Seminary has gone through four periods from the beginning until now. The first period is in the time of Buyid dynasty, in which great figures such as Avicenna and Al-Biruni taught in this seminary. The second period is in the Seljuk dynasty, in which the schools of this seminary expanded a lot. The third period is in the Safavid dynasty, which due to the transfer of the capital to Isfahan and the special attention of the Safavid kings, this seminary reached its peak of prosperity. The fourth period is from the end of the Safavid era to the present era.

Overview of Isfahan
The conquest of Isfahan took place in 643 CE (23 AH) during the caliphate of Omar and its rulers were appointed by the caliphs for up to three hundred years. Therefore, this city was the capital during the time of Buyid dynasty and the Seljuk Empire. During the Seljuk era, it developed rapidly and became one of the most important cities in Iran. Describing Isfahan in the second half of the fourth century AH and referring to silk textiles and its cotton, saffron and various fruits that were exported to other places, Ibn Hawqal says: From Iraq to Khorasan, there was no larger commercial city than Isfahan, except Ray. This situation continued to grow until the invasion of Timur caused the destruction and collapse of a number of cities and towns in Iran. In Isfahan, he ordered the erection of minarets over the heads of 70,000 victims. In 1591 CE (1000 AH), the Safavid capital was moved from Qazvin to Isfahan, and Isfahan once again became one of the most prosperous cities in Iran. In addition to being a socio-political center, it was also a cultural-scientific center and had a large seminary with high-ranking scholars in the Shiite world.

Establishment period
According to what has been narrated in history, the first period of the Isfahan Seminary dates back to the reign of Buyid dynasty. When Muhammad ibn Rustam Dushmanziyar was the ruler of Isfahan, Avicenna went to him. While serving in the time of Muhammad ibn Rustam Dushmanziyar in Isfahan, Avicenna also taught despite his ministerial duties. Isfahan school is a relic of that period.

Period of turmoil
This period coincides with the Seljuk era. In this era, Nizam al-Mulk proposed the movement of building schools and religious-political competitions, so the history of the Shiite seminary is not very clear. Although Hossein Soltanzadeh the author of the History of Iranian schools has mentioned six schools in this era, it is doubtful that they are Shiites. It can be said that Iran has been in political and cultural turmoil since the second half of the fifth century AH, from the Mongol invasion (1219–1221 CE) to the time of Ghazan Khan, one of the Ilkhanate kings (1295-1304 CE). Until he came to power and converted from Buddhism to Islam and change his name to Mahmoud and disobeyed the great Mongol empire based in China. To improve the situation in the country, Ghazan Khan enacted a series of far-reaching reforms and laws and regulations that produced brilliant results. Following Ghazan Khan, nearly 100,000 Mongols converted to Islam, and his successor, Öljaitü (1304-1316 CE), was nicknamed Muhammad Khodabandeh by the Shiites on the occasion of his conversion to the Shiite religion. Thus, until the extinction of the Ilkhanid dynasty of Iran, Islam was the official religion of the Ilkhanate government and its reign was based on Islamic law and customs.

Boom period
This period is one of the most prosperous periods of the Isfahan Seminary. With the invitation of the scholars and scientists of Jabal Amel to Iran and the centralization of Isfahan in the Safavid era, the seminary of Isfahan reached its peak of prosperity. The opposite point of the prosperity period -when the movement of building schools was begun by Nizam al-Mulk to promote the Shafiʽi school- in the third period of the Isfahan Seminary, the movement of building Shiite religious schools took place and dozens of schools were established in the most remote parts of Iran. But the spread of superstitions and moral corruption and turning to the world and material manifestations, disregard for science and literature provided the causes of Safavid decline. Jabal Amel, which has long been a Shiite Imami University and a center for educating scholars in various Islamic sciences such as hadith and Fiqh, Tafsir, Kalam and ethics, paved the way for the prosperity of Shiite thought with Shah Ismail's tendency to Shiism and the invitation of Shiite jurists. However, the history of Shiism in Iran dates back to the first and second centuries AH (622-816 CE).

The period of confrontation with governments
The fourth period of Isfahan seminary is equal to the governments of Afsharid dynasty, Zand dynasty, Qajar dynasty and Pahlavi dynasty. The rulers of these regimes were incompetent and lowly people and did not pay attention to culture and science, and their only goal was to "accumulate treasures" and "give concessions" to foreign countries. Economic poverty led to the acceptance of any kind of contract with foreign governments and led to cultural invasion. Among the agreements was the acceptance of the establishment of foreign schools in Iran, which some countries such as Britain, Germany, France and Russia established in Iran. Setareye Sobh School was one of the schools that opened in Isfahan in September 1910, while Julfa School used to train students in this city.

Safavid period
During the Safavid period, due to the severe pressures on the Shiites in the Ottoman Empire, some Shiite scholars of Jabal Amel emigrated to Iran to seize the opportunity of this political opening and to promote the Shiite religion. Shah Tahmasb Safavid (r. 1524–1576) played the most important role in welcoming these immigrant scholars. Some of these scholars played a role in the formation of the Isfahan Seminary. During the reign of Shah Tahmasb, due to the Shah's special care for the Ulama and also his personal belief and commitment to the rules of Sharia, the Shiite scientific fields flourished and gained special influence. After Shah Tahmasb, during the reign of Shah Ismail II (r. 1576–1577) due to the Shah's tendency to Sunni, Shiite scholars were isolated and even the Shah tried to kill them. After Shah Ismail II in the reign of Mohammad Khodabanda (r. 1578–1587) no attention was paid to the seminary. With the establishment of the reign of Shah Abbas I Safavid (r. 1588–1629) and his actions, Shiite scholars gained more influence, so much so that it can be said that the Isfahan Seminary was actually established during his time.

Afsharid period
Following the capture of Isfahan by Mahmud Afghan and the subsequent rise to power of Nader Shah Afshar (r. 1736–1747) and the insecurity of the city, the Isfahan Seminary lost its former prosperity, forcing a number of scholars to emigrate to other cities.

Qajar period
During the Qajar period (r. 1789–1925), the chair of teaching jurisprudence and principles in the seminary of Isfahan was prosperous. During this period, most scholars learned their education and levels in this city and migrated to the newly prosperous Hawza Najaf to complete their education. Of course, some of them returned to Isfahan after earning a degree in ijtihad and achieving a high level of education, and began teaching and holding other religious affairs. This commuting caused Isfahan to continue to be a pioneer in educating eminent mujtahids.

Pahlavi period
In fact, from this time on, Isfahan Seminary officially became one of the subordinate seminary of the Hawza Najaf, and the learned professors of Najaf settled in this city and provided its scientific achievements to the students. The Isfahan region has lost its prosperity in Pahlavi dynasty decades, especially following the policies of the first Pahlavi.

Current situation
In the last one or two decades, Isfahan Seminary has benefited from the scientific achievements of Qom Seminary and its prominent professors are the graduates of this seminary, as well as Hawza Najaf.

Famous alumnuses

Isfahan Seminary is one of the rare seminaries that has accepted the most scientific migration of Islamic scholars and scientists. Here are some of the men in this field:
 Mir Damad
 Baha' al-din al-'Amili
 Mohammad Taqi Majlesi
 Mohammad-Baqer Majlesi
 Nematollah Jazayeri
 Mohammad Javad Esfahani
 Ahmad Bidabadi
 Mohammad Ali Shah Abadi
 Seyyed Hossein Khademi

Women
 Lady Amin

High level Shiite authorities
Some of the most prominent Shiite authorities and jurists reached higher levels in Isfahan Seminary and then went to Najaf to complete their education; These include:
 Hassan Modarres
 Muhammad Hossein Naini
 Abu l-Hasan al-Isfahani
 Mohammad Reza Masjed Shahi
 Seyyed Jamal al-Din Golpayegani
 Hossein Borujerdi

Scientific and jurisprudential personalities
 Abdollah ibn Mohsen Aeroji
 Rahim Arbab

Influential masters of the Isfahan Seminary

 Sheikh Ali Menshar, Safavid era
 Hossein ibn Abdol al-Samad Haresi, Safavid era
 Mulla Abdollah Tustari, Safavid era
 Baha' al-din al-'Amili, Safavid era
 Lotfollah ibn Abdolkarim Meisi, Safavid era
 Seyyed Mostafa Tafreshi, Safavid era
 Mohammad Baqer Esterabadi, Safavid era
 Mir Fendereski, Safavid era
 Qasem Hassani Tabatabaei Qahpayi, Safavid era
 Mohammad Taqi Majlesi, Safavid era
 Rajab Ali Tabrizi, Safavid era
 Rafi al-Din Mohammad ibn Heydar Hassani Tabatabaei, Safavid era
 Mulla Hossein Boroujerdi, Safavid era
 Mohammad Salih al-Mazandarani, Safavid era
 Rafi al-Din Gilani, Safavid era
 Mohaqqeq Sabzevari, Safavid era
 Agha Hossein Khansari, Safavid era
 Mohammad ibn Hassan Shervani, Safavid era
 Hossein Mar'ashi Hosseini Ameli, Safavid era
 Khalil ibn Qazi Qazvini, Safavid era
 Qazi Jafar ibn Abdollah Kamareh'ee, 12th century AH
 Seyyed Nematollah Jazayeri, 12th century AH
 Mohsen Fayz Kashani, 12th century AH
 Agha Jamal Khansari, 12th century AH
 Mohammad ibn Abdolfattah Tonekaboni, 12th century AH
 Mohammad Saleh Khatoonabadi, 12th century AH
 Agha Hossein Gilani, 12th century AH
 Mirza Abdollah Afandi Esfahani, 12th century AH
 Abolfazl Bahaoddin Mohammad ibn Hassan Esfahani, 12th century AH
 Hazin Lahiji, 12th century AH
 Mohammad Akmal Esfahani, 12th century AH
 Mohammad Sadeq Tonekaboni, 12th century AH
 Abdollah ibn Saleh Bohrani Samahiji, 12th century AH
 Mohammad Zaman ibn Kalbeali Esfahani Tabrizi, 12th century AH
 Mohammad Bagher ibn Hassan Khalifeh Soltani, Nader Shah era
 Mohammad Taghi ibn Mohammad Kazem Almasi Shams Abadi, Nader Shah era
 Mulla Ismail Khajooyi, Nader Shah era
 Mulla Mehrab Gilani, Nader Shah era
 Jafar ibn Hossein Khansari, Nader Shah era
 Mulla Ali ibn Mulla Jamshid Noori, Qajar era
 Mohammad Taghi ibn Mohammad Rahim Esfahani, Qajar era
 Mulla Mohammad Hossein Fesharaki, Pahlavi era
 Mirza Abdol Hossein Seyyed al-Araqayn, Pahlavi era
 Seyyed Mohammad Najaf Abadi, Pahlavi era
 Mohammad Reza Najafi, Pahlavi era
 Mirza Abdol Hossein Najafi, Pahlavi era
 Seyyed Mahdi Dorche'ee, Pahlavi era
 Mirza Mohammad Sadeq Nayeb al-Sadr, Pahlavi era
 Seyyed Ali Najaf Abadi, Pahlavi era
 Agha Noorollah Esfahani, Pahlavi era
 Seyyed Hossein Khademi, recent era
 Seyyed Abdol Hossein Tayyeb, recent era
 Ahmad Faqih Emami, recent era
 Hassan Faqih Emami, recent era
 Hossein Mazaheri, recent era

Courses
Most Islamic sciences are taught periodically and at very high levels in the schools of Isfahan Seminary, the most important of which are the following:
 Fiqh and Principles of Islamic jurisprudence
 Hadith studies
 Philosophy and Rational Sciences
 Traditional medicine and Astronomy
 Mathematics

Schools
One of the characteristics of the Isfahan Seminary, especially in the Safavid period, was the prosperity of school construction in Isfahan. Most of these schools were built by rulers and their allies. Some of those existing schools and some have gradually disappeared:

 Emamzadeh Ismail school, Safavid era
 Jalalieh or Ahmad Abad school, Safavid era
 Almasieh school, Safavid era
 Seqa al-Islam school, Safavid era
 Shafieeyeh school, Safavid era
 Sheikh al-Islam school, Safavid era
 Mulla Abdollah school, Safavid era
 Nim Avard school, Safavid era
 Mayam Beygom school, Safavid era
 Shahzadeha school, Safavid era
 Jadeh Bozorg va Jadeh Koochak school, Safavid era
 Fatemieh school, Safavid era
 Kalbasi or Qoroq Chai beyk school, Safavid era
 Mirza Taqi school, Safavid era
 Mobarakieh school, Safavid era
 Khajeh Malek Mostowfi school, Safavid era
 Ismaeelieh school, Safavid era
 Dar al-Elm school, Safavid era
 Shah or Masjed Jame Abbasi school, Safavid era
 Sheikh Bahayi school, Safavid era
 Mirza Abdollah Afandi school, Safavid era

Although the importance of the Isfahan Seminary has diminished in the last century with the establishment of the Qom Seminary, the seminaries in this city are still standing and students are learning science. Some religious schools that have been established in Isfahan in recent years or have remained from the past and are now open, including:
 Chaharbagh school, recent era
 Seyyed school, recent era
 Sadr school, recent era
 Sadr Chaharbagh Khajoo school, recent era
 Araban school, recent era
 Kaseh Geran school, recent era
 Naseri school, recent era
 Noorieh school, recent era
 Maryam Beygom school, recent era
 Al-Ghadir school, recent era

See also
 Hawza
 Qom Seminary
 Hawza Najaf
 Sadr Madrasa
 Isfahan National Holy Association
 Sheikhan cemetery

References

External links
 Isfahan Seminary website
 Videos: Isfahan Seminary on Aparat
 Isfahan: Religious Seminaries for Men
 Isfahan seminary admits visiting European professors

Isfahan
Seminaries and theological colleges
Shia organizations
Seminaries and theological colleges in Iran